The 1971–72 Australian region cyclone season was a very active tropical cyclone season.

Systems

Tropical Cyclone Rhoda

Tropical Cyclone Rhoda existed from October 20 to October 26.

Tropical Low Kitty

Kitty existed from 2 to 5 December 1971 in the Arafura Sea

Severe Tropical Cyclone Sally

Sally, 3 to 13 December 1971 crossed coast near Broome, Western Australia.

Severe Tropical Cyclone Althea

Tropical Cyclone Althea was a Category 4 cyclone when it hit the coast some 50 km north of Magnetic Island and Townsville in North Queensland on December 24, 1971. Althea produced peak gust wind speeds between 123 and 145 miles per hour (197 and 233 km/h).  Three people died and property damage was estimated at A$115 million loss (1990 value).  On Magnetic Island 90% of the houses were damaged or destroyed.  In Townsville houses were lifted from their foundations and most trees stripped of foliage. Althea was also notable at the time, as it had struck a major city.

Although there was a dangerous storm surge associated with TC Althea (between 2.8 and 3.6 metres) little flooding occurred because the cyclone made landfall on a low tide.  However, the combination of storm surge and wave action demolished The Strand sea wall and houses in low-lying areas were inundated with up to 0.6 metres of water.

Tropical Cyclone Bronwyn

Bronwyn, 3 to 12 January 1972 in Gulf of Carpentaria

Severe Tropical Cyclone Carlotta

Carlotta, 5 to 21 January 1972 well off Queensland

Severe Tropical Cyclone Wendy

Wendy, 30 January to 9 February 1972.

Severe Tropical Cyclone Daisy

Daisy, 7 to 14 February 1972 off Queensland, caused some flooding near Brisbane

Severe Tropical Cyclone Tessie-Gigi

Tessie, 20 to 27 February 1972 in central Indian Ocean

Severe Tropical Cyclone Vicky

Vicky, 24 February to 4 March 1972 crossed Western Australian coast at Cockatoo Island.

Tropical Cyclone Angela

Angela, 29 February to 3 March 1972 near Cocos Island and Christmas Island

Tropical Cyclone Belinda

Belinda, 20 to 30 March 1972 near Christmas Island

Severe Tropical Cyclone Emily

Emily, 27 March to 4 April 1972 off Queensland, eight lives lost at sea

Severe Tropical Cyclone Carol

Carol, 6 to 14 April 1972 in the central Indian Ocean.

Tropical Cyclone Faith

Faith, 11 to 23 April 1972 in Torres Strait and Coral Sea off Queensland

Severe Tropical Cyclone Gail

Gail, 11 to 18 April 1972 well off Queensland

Severe Tropical Cyclone Hannah

Hannah, 8 to 11 May near Papua New Guinea

Severe Tropical Cyclone Ida

Ida, 30 May to 3 June 1972 near Solomon Islands causing $70 million damage.

See also

Atlantic hurricane seasons: 1971, 1972
Eastern Pacific hurricane seasons: 1971, 1972
Western Pacific typhoon seasons: 1971, 1972
North Indian Ocean cyclone seasons: 1971, 1972

References

External links

 Australian Bureau of Meteorology
 Joint Typhoon Warning Center
 Tropical Cyclone Warning Center Jakarta 
 Papua New Guinea National Weather Service

Australian region cyclone seasons
Aust
 disasters in Australia
 disasters in Australia
 disasters in Oceania
 disasters in Oceania